The Rhabditidae are a family of nematodes which includes the model organism Caenorhabditis elegans.

Genera

Bursilla
Bursilla monhysteria (Butschli, 1873)

Caenorhabditis
Caenorhabditis brenneri Sudhaus & Kiontke, 2007
Caenorhabditis briggsae 
Caenorhabditis dolichura 
Caenorhabditis elegans Maupas, 1900
Caenorhabditis rara

Diploscapter
Genus Diploscapter
Diploscapter bicornis 
Diploscapter coronata (Cobb, 1893)
Diploscapter lycostoma 
Diploscapter pachys

Halicephalobus
Halicephalobus gingivalis (Stefanski, 1954) Andrássy, 1984
Halicephalobus mephisto Borgonie, García-Moyano, Litthauer, Bert, Bester, van Heerden, Möller,  Erasmus & Onstott, 2011 
Halicephalobus similigaster (Andrássy, 1952)

Macramphis
Macramphis stercorarius

Mesorhabditis
Mesorhabditis acris 
Mesorhabditis irregularis 
Mesorhabditis oschei 
Mesorhabditis spiculigera

Neorhabditus
Neorhabditus flagellicaudatus

Parasitorhabditus
Parasitorhabditus acuminati 
Parasitorhabditus crypturgophila 
Parasitorhabditus obtusa 
Parasitorhabditus opaci

Pelodera
Pelodera chitwoodi (Bassen, 1940)
Pelodera conica 
Pelodera kolbi 
Pelodera punctata (Cobb, 1914)
Pelodera strongyloides 
Pelodera teres (Schneider, 1866)
Pelodera voelki

Phasmarhabditis
Phasmarhabditis apuliae
Phasmarhabditis bohemica
Phasmarhabditis bonaquaense
Phasmarhabditis californica
Phasmarhabditis hermaphrodita (Schneider)
Phasmarhabditis huizhouensis
Phasmarhabditis neopapillosa
Phasmarhabditis nidrosiensis
Phasmarhabditis papillosa
Phasmarhabditis tawfiki
Phasmarhabditis valida

Poikilolaimus
Poikilolaimus ernstmayri 
Poikilolaimus micoletzkyi 
Poikilolaimus piniperdae

Protorhabditis
Protorhabditis anthobia 
Protorhabditis minuta 
Protorhabditis tristis 
Protorhabditis xylocola

Rhabditis
Rhabditis aberrans 
Rhabditis marina 
Rhabditis maxima 
Rhabditis necromena 
Rhabditis sylvatica 
Rhabditis terricola

Rhabditoides
Rhabditoides frugicola 
Rhabditoides giardi 
Rhabditoides inermis 
Rhabditoides longispina

Rhabditophanes
Rhabditophanes aphodii 
Rhabditophanes insolitus 
Rhabditophanes schneideri

Rhitis
Rhitis inermis Andrassy, 1982

Teratorhabditis
Teratorhabditis boettgeri 
Teratorhabditis coroniger 
Teratorhabditis dentifera

Phylogenetic studies 
The analysis of sequences of three nuclear genes shows that the Diploscapter, Protorhabditis and Prodontorhabditis genera group together to form the 'Protorhabditis' group, the sister group of the Caenorhabditis species, all included in the 'Eurhabditis' group of Rhabditidae genera.

References 

 
Nematode families